A number of steamships have been named Fredericksburg, including:

  a T2 tanker
  a T5 tanker

See also
 , an ironclad of the Confederate States Navy

Ship names